Fulham Palace, in Fulham, London, previously in the former English county of Middlesex, is a Grade I listed building with medieval origins and was formerly the principal residence of the Bishop of London. The site was the country home of the bishops from the 11th century until 1973. Though still owned by the Church of England, the palace, managed by the Fulham Palace Trust (registered charity 1140088) houses a number of restored historic rooms and a museum documenting its long history. The property resides next to Bishops Park and contains a large botanic garden. The palace garden is ranked Grade II* on the Register of Historic Parks and Gardens.

The Palace is open daily and is free to visit. According to figures released by the Fulham Palace Trust, over 390,000 people visited Fulham Palace in 2015/2016.

History

Origins
Prehistoric (6000 BC–AD 43)

Evidence of prehistoric activity dating from the late Mesolithic and early Neolithic age was uncovered by various archaeological investigations undertaken since the early 1970s, depicting the use of struck flint. The site appears to have been an isolated eyot within the braided river channel of the River Thames. Later prehistoric activity dating to the Bronze Age, was revealed in the form of a possible barrow, whilst there is limited evidence for a late Iron Age occupation.

Roman period (AD 43–AD 410)

After a period of abandonment, the site was reoccupied during the late Roman period. Much of the material retrieved is domestic in origin and appears to suggest a small agricultural community was established on the banks of the Thames. It may have taken the form of a villa on this site or approximate to the neighbouring All Saints Church.

Saxon period (AD 410–1066)

There is little evidence of Saxon activity on the Fulham Palace site, although some sherds of early Saxon pottery have been recovered. The Manor of Fulham was acquired by Bishop Waldhere from Bishop Tyrhtel in AD 704. It stretched from modern-day Chiswick in the west to Chelsea on the east; and from Harlesden in the northwest and Kensal Green in the northeast.

Medieval period (1066–1485)

The earliest evidence of Medieval life at Fulham Palace was a hearth that dates to around 1080, probably belonging to the Saxo-Norman Manor. The first historical reference to a Bishop of London residing at Fulham Palace arose when Robert de Sigello (Bishop of London) was held captive at Fulham Palace during The Anarchy. The Medieval Palace was established around what is now the Palace's eastern courtyard. The first reference to the Palace's chapel at this time was from 1231. Plans drawn up by Stiff Leadbetter prior to the redevelopment of the site in the late 18th century locate the chapel and its associated buildings beneath much of the 18th-century structure that still stands today. Although various fragments of stonework associated with the chapel have been uncovered, its form remains elusive, only one Parliamentary Survey, undertaken by William Dickes during the Civil War in 1647, described it.

At some point between 1439 and 1440, Henry VI and his entourage visited. Following his departure, it would take four days for the rooms and halls to be cleaned. Shortly after, a shingle board was taken from the Fulham Church to cover and repair the palace hall roof, and palings (fence posts) were mended between the 'house husbandry (farming area), great garden, and vyne garden.' A new bucket was also purchased for the well at the cost of 6d. The well is understood to have been built in 1426. Further buildings alluded to include a larder, a hayloft, and a stable. 

Tudor period (1485–1603)

Substantial alterations were made to the Palace during the late 15th century, a period that witnessed the construction of the current great hall and the Tudor Courtyard, which still stands today. It is assumed that the development was undertaken by either Bishop Thomas Kempe c. 1480 or Bishop Richard FitzJames (1506-1522), principally because FitzJames’ coat of arms appears on the south side of the Tudor court buildings. In addition, analysis of the timbers within the great hall roof suggests that the oak used was felled in the spring of 1493, whilst the gate to the Tudor arched entrance contains timber felled in the spring of 1495. A two-year time frame for such a considerable building project certainly seems appropriate (at least in terms of partial construction). If the timber dates are accurate, then the court and hall were both built by Bishop Richard Hill. The Bishop would not have much time to enjoy his new residence, though, as he died in 1496.

The current structure, built by Bishop Richard FitzJames, dates from the reign of Henry VII (1485–1509). The structure underwent numerous modifications and alterations: the west courtyard is from the Tudor Period; the east courtyard is Georgian, the great hall is late-medieval; the eastern end of the building was renovated in Gothic style in the late 18th century; the east courtyard was classicised in the early 19th century, and the chapel was constructed in 1867.

Fulham Palace is a Grade I-listed building standing within a scheduled ancient monument. A number of structures on the property are Grade II-listed buildings including the chapel, moat bridge and attached piers, stables, walls of the walled garden, vinery, and bothies.

The palace garden

The garden at Fulham Palace has been one of the most important botanical gardens since the 16th century and is the second oldest in London. Bishop Grindal (c. 1519 – 1583) built a Tudor walled garden and a series of parterre gardens. He is credited with the introduction of the tamarisk tree to England and grew grapes that were sent to Elizabeth I.

In the early part of the 17th century, the gardens at Fulham Palace appear to have suffered from some unsympathetic attention. The antiquary John Aubrey records among his memoranda, "the Bishop of London did cutte-down a noble Clowd of trees at Fulham", occasioning the sharp remark from Sir Francis Bacon, a dedicated gardener, "that he was a good Expounder of dark places." This changed with Bishop Henry Compton (1675–1713) who introduced many new plant species to England in the gardens at Fulham Palace, including the American magnolia, M. virginiana, Liriodendron, Liquidambar and the first American azalea grown in England, Rhododendron viscosum. In his heated "stoves" he grew the first coffee tree in England. The red horse chestnut, a hybrid of Aesculus hippocastanum and the American Aesculus pavia, was still noted in Fulham Palace gardens as late as 1751. His gardener was George London

By 1681, the gardens at Fulham Palace were already remarkable, as John Evelyn noted when he visited them. Bishop Compton's gardener in the early years was George London, who started a famous nursery at Brompton the year of Evelyn's visit. By 1686, William Penn's gardener was hoping to exchange the exotic flora of Pennsylvania for seedlings and slips of trees and shrubs and seeds from Fulham Palace gardens. Compton's staunch defense of his former pupils, the Princesses Mary and Anne, led to his appointment as Deputy Superintendent of the Royal Gardens to William III and Mary II, and as Commissioner for Trade and Plantations. In the colonies, Compton had a botanical correspondent in John Banister, who was sent first to the West Indies and then to Virginia, and who, before his untimely death, sent Bishop Compton drawings, seeds, and herbarium specimens from which the Bishop's close friend John Ray compiled the first published account of North American flora, in his Historia Plantarum (1688).

World War I
In 1918, part of the grounds of the palace was converted into allotments, for growing food to help the war effort. The palace itself formed part of Fulham military hospital. After the war, the church found it increasingly difficult to maintain such a large, expensive building. The Bishop of London at the time, Arthur Winnington-Ingram, offered to give up the palace and live in two rooms as he had while the palace was being used "for the purpose of the National Mission" (the war effort). However, the bishop was unwilling to let the palace pass into secular hands.

World War II
Parts of the palace were damaged by bombing, and after the war, the church found it increasingly difficult to maintain this large, expensive historic building. In 1954, the Church Commissioners' architect described the palace as "badly planned and inconvenient". After many years of indecision the church authorities vacated the palace in 1973.

The Palace moat
It was the largest domestic moated site in medieval England but its origin is unknown. The first known reference to the moat was in a 1392 document that refers to magna fossa ('great ditch') but it is thought to be much older. Its distance from the palace suggests that it might have had a function other than defence. An alternative idea is that it was built by the Danes as a safeguard against flooding by the Thames. In 1976, the moated enclosure was designated as a Scheduled Ancient Monument.

The moat was filled in with debris in the 1920s, at the request of the bishop of the time, Arthur Winnington-Ingram. Despite this, the entire moat still exists, underground, as an unbroken circuit. In 2010, an excavation of the moat began as part of a £8 million renovation of the palace and adjoining Bishops Park.

The Tait chapel

The Tait chapel at Fulham Palace, the fourth on the site, was designed by William Butterfield for Bishop Tait in 1866–7. It is dedicated to the Blessed Trinity and it cost £1869.
Damaged by a bomb in World War II, the chapel was reorganized in the 1950s for Bishop Wand. The Salviati mosaic reredos was moved to the west end. The east window, destroyed in the war, was replaced by a new window by Ninian Comper in 1956. It shows "The Risen Saviour" with the message "Feed my sheep"; Bishops Creighton and Wand stand on either side. The top window commemorates Wand's son who died in a mountaineering accident in 1934. The west window by Clayton and Bell survived.
Butterfield's patterned brickwork was painted over by Brian Thomas and students from Byam Shaw School of Art in 1953. The north wall painting shows: "The Fall" with Adam; the nativity is below; Atonement with the crucifixion, and the Last Supper with the gift of the Holy Spirit. The south wall: St Peter and a vision of unclean beasts, the stoning of St Stephen, the risen Christ with two hands of God the Father, Conversion of St Paul.

Fulham Palace today

After the Bishops of London left the Palace in 1973, in 1975, the property was leased for 100 years by Hammersmith Council for the purpose of opening a museum and art gallery. After this, the palace and gardens suffered a period of neglect. In 1990, a trust was established to oversee the property in collaboration with the council.

Although the Palace has its own chapel, the garden adjoins the churchyard of the neighbouring parish church, All Saints Church, Fulham, where several former bishops are buried. The allotments planted during the war still survive; many are still in use, allowing local people to grow their own vegetables, fruit and flowers.

Some of the ancient trees in and around Fulham Palace remain to this day, and visitors can still see the knot garden and wisteria which survive in the Palace's walled gardens. A large holm oak (Quercus ilex) is believed to be 500 years old and has been designated as one of the Great Trees of London.

Restoration of the palace and grounds
The Fulham Palace Restoration Project began in the 2000s and was carried out in three phases. The first phase, completed in 2006, restored the east wing of the palace and part of the west wing including the Tudor courtyard at the cost of £4 million. The second phase focused on the walled garden, the outbuildings, and the moat, and was completed in 2011, costing £7 million. The third phase was completed in 2019 and includes a new museum as well as significant restoration work to the brickwork in the Tudor courtyard and the Tudor great hall. Funding for all three phases came from the National Lottery Heritage Fund and Fulham Palace Trust.

Museum and art gallery

In 1992, the Museum of Fulham Palace was set up in Bishop Howley's Dining Room and Bishop Porteus's Library (named after Bishop Beilby Porteus, 1731–1809), in the early 19th century part of the Palace. It contained some of the paintings that once hung in the building, stained glass, carved fragments of masonry and a bishop's cope, as well as displays describing the palace's history.

The lost manuscript of William Bradford's Of Plymouth Plantation (1620–47), an important founding document of the United States, was discovered in the library in 1855, and first published the next year. No one knows how it made its way there from America, but in 1897, it was given to Thomas F. Bayard, U.S. Ambassador to the United Kingdom, and repatriated to New England.

The palace's art collection includes a number of notable portraits: two 1798 works by Benjamin West, St Margaret of Scotland and Thomas a Becket; an oil on canvas of Field Marshal George Wade by Adriaen van Diest; an oil on canvas of Beilby Porteus by John Hoppner; and a Reginald Henry Lewis oil on canvas of William Wand.

Visitor access
The house and garden are open daily with free admission. The museum and historic rooms are open from 10.30 - 17.00 (10.30 - 16.00 in the winter). The restored walled garden is open daily from 10.15 - 16.15 (10.15 - 15.45 in the winter). The botanic garden is open daily from dawn to dusk. The café is in what was once Bishop Howley's dining room, and now serves lunches and light refreshments.

The palace can be accessed from Fulham Palace Road, close to the northern end of Putney Bridge, as well as Bishop's Park and All Saints Church, Fulham. The nearest Underground station is

See also
 History of London

Notes

References

External links

 Chandler, Andrew, The Church of England in the Twentieth Century: the Church Commissioners Retrieved January 2012
 
 Images of England page with listing details Retrieved January 2012

Art museums and galleries in London
Christianity in London
Episcopal palaces in London
Fulham
Grade I listed buildings in the London Borough of Hammersmith and Fulham
Grade I listed palaces
Grade I listed museum buildings
Grade II* listed parks and gardens in London
Historic house museums in London
History of the London Borough of Hammersmith and Fulham
Houses in the London Borough of Hammersmith and Fulham
Museums in the London Borough of Hammersmith and Fulham
Tudor architecture